Guoliang is a village of Tongguan Subdistrict in Wangcheng District, Changsha City, Hunan Province, China. The village is named after the worker's movement leader Guo Liang.

References

Villages in China
Wangcheng District